The 21º Corona Rally México, the fourth round of the 2007 World Rally Championship season, took place between March 9–11 2007. The rally consisted of 20 special stages, of which five were super specials. The event was won by Citroën's Sébastien Loeb, followed by Ford drivers Marcus Grönholm and Mikko Hirvonen.

The drivers' championship leaders, Grönholm and Hirvonen, were the first drivers on road and lost time as they had to sweep the loose gravel. They were followed by Loeb, who was able to keep close to Subaru's Petter Solberg, who benefited from his better starting position during the first three stages. However, Solberg, in the new Subaru Impreza WRC 07,  had to retire at the start of SS6 giving the lead to Loeb. After the first day, Ford identified and fixed a sensory fault in Grönholm's car. The problem had caused lack of engine power and troubled the Finn: "In the morning, I was sweeping. In the afternoon, I was sleeping". The second leg saw Grönholm quickly climb to second place, but Loeb continued setting top times and extended his lead to Grönholm from 43 to 60 seconds. Hirvonen, Chris Atkinson and Dani Sordo battled for the third place. Hirvonen was the fastest driver on the final day and secured the last podium position, ahead of Sordo, Atkinson, Manfred Stohl, Jari-Matti Latvala and Matthew Wilson. Loeb took the win 55.8 seconds clear of Grönholm.


Results

Retirements 
  Nasser Al-Attiyah - mechanical (SS2/3);
  Petter Solberg - no oil pressure (SS5/6);
  Francisco Name - retired between leg 1 and 2 (before SS8);
  Martin Rauam - gearbox failure (SS9);
  Gareth MacHale - damaged suspension (SS13);
  Leszek Kuzaj - mechanical (SS13);

Special Stages 
All dates and times are CST (UTC-6).

Championship standings after the event

Drivers' championship

Manufacturers' championship

References

External links
 Results on official site - WRC.com
 Results on eWRC-results.com
 Results on RallyBase.nl

Mexico
Rally Mexico
Rally